Zardband (also Romanized as Zardeband; also known as Zard Band-e Lashgarak and Zard Band-e Lashkarak) is a village in Rudbar-e Qasran Rural District, Rudbar-e Qasran District, Shemiranat County, Tehran Province, Iran. At the 2006 census, its population was 189, in 67 families.

References 

Populated places in Shemiranat County